Adrastea (minor planet designation: 239 Adrastea) is a main belt asteroid. It was discovered by Johann Palisa on 18 August 1884 in Vienna, and was named after the Greek nymph Adrasteia. The orbital plane is tilted at an angle of 6.17° to the plane of the ecliptic.

The result is close to the  period from a study performed in 2003. The asteroid is roughly 42 km in diameter.

References

External links 
 The Asteroid Orbital Elements Database
 Minor Planet Discovery Circumstances
 
 

Background asteroids
Adrastea
18840818
Adrastea